Ladalen Station is a disused railway station on the Nordland Line located in Trondheim, Norway serving the area of Lade. The station was serviced by the local trains Trøndelag Commuter Rail operated by the Norwegian State Railways (NSB). The station opened in 1989, and was closed on 15 June 2008, when a bridge at Leangen Station allowed access to the north side of the tracks. It served what is primarily an industrial area. The station was located west of Lilleby and east of Leangen.

References 

Disused railway stations in Norway
Railway stations in Trondheim
Railway stations on the Nordland Line
Railway stations on the Meråker Line
Railway stations opened in 1989
Railway stations closed in 2008
1989 establishments in Norway
2008 disestablishments in Norway